Glossolalia is the second solo album by  Steve Walsh, released in 2000. It was released on Magna Carta Records and features Trent Gardner, Virgil Donati, and Walsh's Kansas bandmate Billy Greer.

Track listing
 "Glossolalia" - 5:32
 "Serious Wreckage" - 6:02
 "Heart Attack" - 4:18
 "Kansas" - 8:54
 "Nothing" - 3:08
 "Haunted Man" - 5:37 
 "Smackin' the Clowns" - 10:04
 "That's What Love's All About" - 5:12
 "Mascara Tears" - 5:42
 "Rebecca" - 5:15

Musicians
Steve Walsh: vocals, keyboards
Trent Gardner: keyboards, trombone
Virgil Donati: drums
Page Waldrap: steel and acoustic guitars
Jim Roberts: Hammond organ
Mike Slamer: guitar
Billy Greer: bass
Additional musicians: Wayne Gardner, David Manion, Steve Brownlow

References

2000 albums
Steve Walsh (musician) albums
Magna Carta Records albums